Ian Robert Handysides (14 December 1962 – 17 August 1990) was an English footballer.

Handysides was born in Jarrow. He began his footballing career when he joined Birmingham City on leaving school in 1979. A year later he made his first-team debut as a midfielder and by 1982 was a regular player in Birmingham's First Division side. By the turn of 1984, he had lost his place in the first team and was transferred to Walsall (in the Third Division) in hope of getting more first-team chances. He was a regular player for Walsall and within two years of joining, he returned to Birmingham.

In the autumn of 1986, Handysides was loaned out to Wolverhampton Wanderers and scored twice in 11 Fourth Division fixtures. On his return to Birmingham, he quickly re-established himself as a first-team regular and made 30 appearances in the 1987-88 Second Division campaign, scoring three goals, as he helped the club avoid relegation.

In the autumn of 1988, Handysides was diagnosed with a brain tumour. After a course of chemotherapy, he appeared to be recovering well, however this then spread to his spine and he died in Solihull on 17 August 1990, when still only 27 years old.

References

Sporting-heroes.net

1962 births
Sportspeople from Jarrow
People from Hebburn
Footballers from Tyne and Wear
1990 deaths
English footballers
Association football midfielders
Birmingham City F.C. players
Walsall F.C. players
Wolverhampton Wanderers F.C. players
English Football League players
Deaths from brain cancer in England
Neurological disease deaths in England